Premier Guitar is a media company devoted to guitarists. It is based in Marion, Iowa, and it's staff is focused on creating the best website, videos, podcasts, and print/digital magazine for gearheads around the world. Interviews have included guitarists such as Pete Townshend of The Who, Ron Wood of the Rolling Stones, Joe Perry of Aerosmith, Guthrie Govan, Brent Hinds and Bill Kelliher of Mastodon, and Dave Mustaine and Chris Broderick of Megadeth. The magazine is published online for free, and includes multimedia such as instructional videos and podcasts  Premier Guitar was originally published under the name Musicians Hotline through 2006.

History 
Premier Guitar was founded in February 2007. Premier Guitar is published by Gearhead Communications, LLC, a privately owned company that is headquartered in Marion, Iowa. Premier Guitar also has offices in Nashville, Minneapolis, Los Angeles, San Francisco, and Peterborough, New Hampshire.

Content
Premier Guitar'''s editorial staff is composed of experienced musicians, and the content consists largely of guitar and bass-related news and gear coverage, as well as instructional material. Premier Guitar has interviewed dozens of world-famous guitarists, including The Who's Pete Townshend, Ron Wood of the Rolling Stones, Aerosmith's Joe Perry, Annie Clark, Guthrie Govan, Bonnie Raitt, Steve Vai, Joe Satriani, the Black Keys' Dan Auerbach, Dave Mustaine and David Ellefson of Megadeth, Brent Hinds and Bill Kelliher of Mastodon, Bruce Cockburn, Alex Skolnick of Testament, Todd Snider and experimental luthier Yuri Landman.

FormatPremier Guitar is published in print and online on a monthly basis all around the globe.

All editions of Premier Guitar are available online for free. The digital version includes all the content of the print version, as well as added multimedia content. Premier Guitar also has applications that make it fully accessible on iPhone, iPad, and Android devices.

MultimediaPremier Guitar's website provides daily news, exclusive stories, complete video lessons in all genres, and written and video gear reviews. This in addition to our free digital magazine provides 100% of the content provided in the print magazine at zero cost to the end user. Premier Guitar's'' YouTube channel boasts over 450k subscribers and features gear demos, artists interviews, in-studio music, and the popular Rig Rundown series.

Staff

Editorial Staff
Ted Drozdowski - Editorial Director
Tessa Jeffers - Managing Editor
Charles Saufley - Gear Editor
Chris Kies - Associate Editor
Jason Shadrick - Associate Editor
Meghan Molumby - Art Director
Ben Kuriscak - Digital Designer
John Bohlinger - Nashville Correspondent
Perry Bean - Nashville Video Editor
Meghan Molumby - Senior Art Editor
Management
Patti Erenberger - Chairperson and President
Gary Ciocci - Managing Director
Jon Levy - Publisher

References

External links

Free Digital Magazine

Guitar magazines
Monthly magazines published in the United States
Music magazines published in the United States
Magazines established in 2007
Marion, Iowa
2007 establishments in Iowa
Magazines published in Iowa